The 2019 season was the Arizona Cardinals' 100th in the National Football League (NFL), their 32nd in Arizona and their first under head coach Kliff Kingsbury, following the firing of former head coach Steve Wilks the previous season. During the offseason, the Cardinals' home stadium was renamed from University of Phoenix Stadium to State Farm Stadium. The Cardinals were one of two current teams, along with the Chicago Bears, who were among the 14 charter members of the American Professional Football Association, which later became the NFL, that celebrated its 100th season in 2019. The Cardinals improved on their 3–13 campaign in 2018. However, they were mathematically eliminated from  playoff contention for the fourth straight season after a Week 13 loss to the Los Angeles Rams.

Bill Bidwill, who had owned the team since 1972, died on October 2, 2019, at the age of 88.

Offseason

Signings

Draft

Notes
 As the result of a negative differential of free agent signings and departures that the Cardinals experienced during the  free agency period, the team received four compensatory selections for the 2019 draft.

Draft trades
 The Cardinals traded their seventh-round selection and the rights to former head coach Bruce Arians to the Tampa Bay Buccaneers in exchange for the Buccaneers' sixth-round selection.
 The Cardinals received a second-round pick from the Miami Dolphins, number 62 overall, and a 2020 fifth-round pick in exchange for quarterback Josh Rosen.

Supplemental draft

The Cardinals selected Washington State safety Jalen Thompson in the fifth round of the 2019 supplemental draft that was held on July 10. As a result, the Cardinals will forfeit their fifth-round selection during the 2020 draft.

Roster changes

In addition to receiving the number one overall draft pick, the Cardinals also have the top spot on the waiver wire by virtue of having the worst record in the NFL during the 2018 season. The Cardinals picked up Pharoh Cooper (wide receiver, previously from the Los Angeles Rams), D. J. Swearinger (safety, previously from the Washington Redskins), Tanner Vallejo (linebacker, previously from the Cleveland Browns), Robert Alford (cornerback, previously from the Atlanta Falcons), Brooks Reed (outside linebacker, previously from the Atlanta Falcons), and Charles Clay (tight end, previously from the Buffalo Bills).

Staff

Final roster

Preseason

Regular season

Schedule

Note: Intra-division opponents are in bold text.

Game summaries

Week 1: vs. Detroit Lions

Week 2: at Baltimore Ravens

Week 3: vs. Carolina Panthers

Week 4: vs. Seattle Seahawks

Week 5: at Cincinnati Bengals

Week 6: vs. Atlanta Falcons

Week 7: at New York Giants

Week 8: at New Orleans Saints

Week 9: vs. San Francisco 49ers

Week 10: at Tampa Bay Buccaneers

Week 11: at San Francisco 49ers

The Cardinals were swept by the 49ers for the first time since 2013.

Week 13: vs. Los Angeles Rams

Week 14: vs. Pittsburgh Steelers

Week 15: vs. Cleveland Browns

Week 16: at Seattle Seahawks

Week 17: at Los Angeles Rams

Standings

Division

Conference

References

External links
 

Arizona
Arizona Cardinals seasons
Arizona Cardinals